Nourse is a surname. Notable people with the surname include:

Alan E. Nourse, (1928–1992), American science fiction author and physician
Alice Nourse (1882–1967), American novelist
Amos Nourse (1794–1877), American medical doctor and Senator
Chet Nourse (1887–1958), American baseball relief pitcher
Christopher Nourse (born 1946), British arts administrator
Dave Nourse (1878–1948), South African cricketer
Dick Nourse, American news anchor
Dudley Nourse (1910–1981), South African cricketer and batsman
Edith Nourse Rogers (1881–1960), American social welfare volunteer and politician
Edward Everett Nourse (1863–1929), American Congregational theologian
Edwin Griswold Nourse (1883–1974), American economist
Elizabeth Nourse (1859–1938), American portrait and landscape painter
Henry Nourse (1780–1838), London wine merchant, lobbied Parliament for settlement of Englishmen in South Africa, 1820 Settlers
Henry Nourse (1857–1942), South African Businessman, gold mines, Olympic athlete, President S. A. Olympic Committee
John Nourse, bookseller died 1780
Joseph Nourse (1754–1841), first United States Register of the Treasury
Joseph Nourse R.N., C.B., Commodore (1780 – 1824), Naval officer, Napoleonic Wars, War of 1812
Joseph Nourse R.N., Lt. (1807–1903), Naval officer, Port Natal, Farmer
Lauren Nourse (born 1982), Australian netball player
Sir Martin Nourse (born 1932), British judge
Mary Nourse (1880–1971), American educator
Rebecca Nourse (1621–1692), executed for witchcraft in the Salem witch trials
Robert Nourse, entrepreneur
Victoria F. Nourse, American professor of law

See also
Nourse Line, shipping company founded by James Nourse